This is a comparison of notable web frameworks, software used to build and deploy web applications.

General
Basic information about each framework.

Systems listed on a light purple background are no longer in active development.

ASP.NET

C++

ColdFusion Markup Language (CFML)

Elixir

Haskell

Java

JavaScript

Perl

PHP

Python

Ruby

Scala

Others

Comparison of features

C++

ColdFusion Markup Language (CFML)

Java

JavaScript

Perl

PHP

Python

Ruby

Others

See also

Comparison of JavaScript frameworks
Comparison of shopping cart software
Content management system
Java view technologies and frameworks
List of content management systems
List of rich web application frameworks
List of web service frameworks
Mobile development framework

References

 Web application frameworks
Web application frameworks